Joke Kleijweg (born 9 January 1962, in Maasland) is a retired female long-distance runner from the Netherlands. She won the 1991 edition of the Rotterdam Marathon, clocking 2:34:18 on Sunday April 21, 1991. Later that year she competed at the World Championships in Tokyo, where she didn't finish the women's marathon race.
Kleijweg won the Parelloop 10K in race in the Netherlands in 1991.

Achievements
All results regarding marathon, unless stated otherwise

References

1962 births
Living people
Dutch female long-distance runners
Dutch female marathon runners
World Athletics Championships athletes for the Netherlands
People from Midden-Delfland
Sportspeople from South Holland
20th-century Dutch women
21st-century Dutch women